The 2019 Biathlon Junior World Championships was held in Osrblie, Slovakia from 27 January to 3 February 2019. There was a total of 16 competitions: sprint, pursuit, individual and relay races for men and women.

Schedule
All times are local (UTC+1).

Results

Junior events

Junior Men

Junior Women

Youth events

Youth Men

Youth Women

Medal table

References

External links
Official website

Biathlon Junior World Championships
2019 in biathlon
2019 in Slovak sport
Biathlon competitions in Slovakia
2019 in youth sport
January 2019 sports events in Europe
February 2019 sports events in Europe